The Nantes International is an international badminton tournament held in Nantes, France. The event is part of the Badminton World Federation's International Challenge and part of the Badminton Europe Elite Circuit. It was held for the first time in 2022.

Previous winners

Performances by nation

References

External links 
 Badminton French

Badminton tournaments in France
2022 establishments in France